Cirkle is a public relations agency with teams specialising across Consumer, B2B and Corporate services, supported by a strong social and digital offering as well as a specialism in Influencer Relations. It was founded in 1998 and was acquired in 2022 by Accordience. 

Public relations companies of the United Kingdom